Dodge City, Kansas, is a city in the United States, noted for its place in Wild West history.

Dodge City may also refer to: 
 Dodge City, Alabama
 Dodge City (film), a 1939 Western starring Errol Flynn
 Dodge City Community College, a public college
 Dodge City Conquistadors, the community college's sports teams
 Dodge City High School, a public school
 Dodge City station, an Amtrak train station
 Roman Catholic Diocese of Dodge City
 Dodge City Regional Airport
 Dodge City Army Air Field, also known as Dodge City Municipal Airport, an abandoned airfield
 Dodge City Legend, a former United States Basketball League team
 Dodge City Law, a professional indoor football team

See also
 Dodge City Gang, a group of Kansas gunfighters and gamblers who dominated Las Vegas, New Mexico, in 1879 and early 1880